Chapel Haddlesey is a village and civil parish in the Selby District of North Yorkshire, England. The village used to be in the Barkston Ash Wapentake and up until 1974, it was in the West Riding of Yorkshire. The village is just east off the A19 road, which crosses the River Aire on Haddlesey Bridge.

Overview
At the west end of the village is the Church of England primary school, which has an age range of 4–11, and an average of 50 pupils on the roster. The St John the Baptist Church is at the east end of the village. The church was built in 1836 on the site of a previous religious house that dated back to the 14th century. Originally the church was a chapel of ease, as it was part of the parish of Birkin. It formed its own parish, along with the nearby villages of Temple Hirst and Hirst Courtney in 1873.

Boats used to travel up the River Aire to the south of the village and a weir and lock (Haddlesey Old Lock) were constructed in 1702. The lock became redundant upon the opening of the Selby Canal in 1778, but the weir was kept in place to allow headwaters to build up and keep the mouth from the canal at Selby in deep water. The canal mouth is at West Haddlesey, which is just  to the west of Chapel Haddlesey.

In 2016, Haddlesey Old Lock was converted into a hydro power station to generate enough electricity for 440 homes. The bottom of the lock is also the normal tidal limit for the River Aire.

References

Civil parishes in North Yorkshire
Selby District
Villages in North Yorkshire